The 2014 Icelandic Men's Football League Cup was the 19th season of the Icelandic Men's League Cup, a pre-season professional football competition in Iceland. The competition started on 15 February 2014 and concluded on 25 April 2014. Breiðablik were the reigning champions, having won their first League Cup last year.

The 24 teams from the Úrvalsdeild karla and 1. deild karla were divided into 3 groups of 8 teams. Every team played every other team of its group once, home, away or on a neutral ground for a total of 7 games. Each group winner, each runner-up and the two best third-place finishes entered the quarter-finals.

Group stage
The games will be played from 15 February to 12 April 2014.

Group 1

Group 2

Group 3

Knockout stage
The top two teams of each group and the two best third-place entered the quarterfinals.

Quarterfinals
The games were played on 16 and 17 April.

Semifinals
The games were played on 21 April.

Final

Top goalscorers

References

External links
 Icelandic FA

Deildabikar
Deildabikar
Icelandic Men's Football League Cup